Brierfield may refer to:

 Brierfield, New South Wales, in Bellingen Shire, Australia

United Kingdom
 Brierfield, Lancashire
 Brierfield railway station
 Brierfield (ward)
 Brierfield Swifts F.C.

United States
 Brierfield, Alabama
 Brierfield Plantation, Mississippi